Darband-e Gharbi (also Romanized as Darband-e Gharbī and Darband Gharbi; also known as Darband, Darband Sharghi, Dorband-e Gharbī, Dorband-e Shargī, and Dowrband-e Gharbī) is a village in Howmeh-ye Gharbi Rural District, in the Central District of Khorramshahr County, Khuzestan Province, Iran. At the 2006 census, its population was 1,364, in 276 families.

References 

Populated places in Khorramshahr County